Lists of acting awards are indexes to articles about notable awards given for acting. They include general awards, awards for a specific medium (film, theatre or television), and awards for actresses, male actors, supporting actors and young actors.

General

 Art Prize of the German Democratic Republic
 Doris Duke Performing Artist Award.
 The Gielgud Award
 Golden Boot Awards
 Primetime Emmy Award for Outstanding Voice-Over Performance
 TVB Star Awards Malaysia

By medium

 List of film acting awards
 List of theatre acting awards
 List of television acting awards

Actresses

 List of awards for actresses
 List of film awards for lead actress 
 List of television awards for Best Actress

Male actors

 List of awards for male actors
 List of film awards for lead actor
 List of television awards for Best Actor

Young actors

 List of awards for supporting actor (film and television, male and female)
 List of awards for young actors

See also

 Lists of awards
 List of performing arts awards

References

Acting